Sweden is a town in Monroe County, New York, United States. It is part of the Rochester metropolitan area, New York. This town is located on the west border of the county. The Erie Canal passes through the northern part of the town and Route 19 is a major north-south highway. The population was 14,175 at the 2010 census.

History 
This town was part of The Triangle Tract. Settlers began arriving before 1806. The town was created by a mandate of the New York State Legislature in 1813 to break up the west part of the county into three new towns named Bergen, Sweden and Murray.

The town of Sweden was established in 1814 from the Town of Murray in part of Monroe County. The first Sweden town meeting was held on April 5, 1814.

Lake View Cemetery was listed on the National Register of Historic Places in 2009.

Geography

The town of Sweden is bordered on the north by the town of Clarkson, on the west by Orleans County, on the south by Genesee County, and on the east by the towns of Parma and Ogden.

Demographics

As of the census of 2000, there were 13,716 people, 4,581 households, and 2,757 families residing in the town.  The population density was 408.9 people per square mile (157.8/km2).  There were 4,843 housing units at an average density of 144.4 per square mile (55.7/km2).  The racial makeup of the town was 92.59% White, 3.72% African American, 0.20% Native American, 1.04% Asian, 0.06% Pacific Islander, 1.06% from other races, and 1.33% from two or more races. Hispanic or Latino of any race were 2.88% of the population.

There were 4,581 households, out of which 29.8% had children under the age of 18 living with them, 46.5% were married couples living together, 10.5% had a female householder with no husband present, and 39.8% were non-families. 26.5% of all households were made up of individuals, and 7.4% had someone living alone who was 65 years of age or older.  The average household size was 2.52 and the average family size was 3.06.

In the town, the population was spread out, with 19.9% under the age of 18, 30.1% from 18 to 24, 23.2% from 25 to 44, 19.0% from 45 to 64, and 7.8% who were 65 years of age or older.  The median age was 25 years. For every 100 females, there were 94.8 males.  For every 100 females age 18 and over, there were 93.4 males.

The median income for a household in the town was $44,151, and the median income for a family was $58,750. Males had a median income of $39,850 versus $27,103 for females. The per capita income for the town was $17,874.  About 4.3% of families and 13.3% of the population were below the poverty line, including 6.9% of those under age 18 and 7.3% of those age 65 or over.

Government

The town is governed by a town board consisting of a town supervisor and four councilpersons, all elected by registered town voters.

Notable person
Amaziah B. James, former US Congressman

Communities and locations in Sweden
Brockport – A village near the northern town line that is home to the State University of New York Brockport.
Ledgedale Airpark (7G0) – A general aviation airport is located southeast of Brockport.
Seymour Library - A public library serving Brockport, Clarkson, & Sweden NY
Sweden Center – A hamlet on Route 19 south of Brockport.
West Sweden – A location in the southwest corner of the town. The John and Chauncey White House was listed on the National Register of Historic Places in 2013.

References

External links

Rochester metropolitan area, New York
Towns in Monroe County, New York
1813 establishments in New York (state)
Populated places established in 1813